War reparations of Finland to the Soviet Union were originally worth US$300,000,000 at 1938 prices (equivalent to US$ in ). Finland agreed to pay the reparations in the Moscow Armistice signed on 19 September 1944.  The protocol to determine more precisely the war reparations to the Soviet Union was signed in December 1944, by the prime minister Juho Kusti Paasikivi and the chairman of the Allied Control Commission for controlling the Moscow Armistice in Helsinki, Andrei Zhdanov.

Finland was originally obliged to pay $300,000,000 in gold to be paid in the form of ships and machinery, over six years. The Soviet Union agreed to prolong the payment period from six to eight years in late 1945. In summer 1948 the sum was cut to $226,500,000 (equivalent to US$ in ). The last dispatched train of the deliveries paying the war reparations crossed the border between Finland and the Soviet Union on 18 September 1952, in Vainikkala railway border station.  Approximately 340,000 railroad carloads were needed to deliver all reparations.

The authority responsible for deliveries, and also organising production agreements with the manufacturers according to the protocols, was Sotakorvausteollisuuden valtuuskunta, the delegation of the war reparations industry. The preliminary committee was established on 9 October 1944. It was chaired by the industrialist Walter Gräsbeck, with Jaakko Rautanen as secretary, and Gunnar Jaatinen, Juho Jännes, Johan Nykopp, Arno Solin, and Wilhelm Wahlforss as members.

Some deliveries

Electrical
52,500 electric engines, 1,140 transformational stations, and 30 mills with power stations

Locomotives
Lokomo together with Tampella produced 525 narrow gauge locomotives, PT-4 series.

Valmet
Move 21, a railway engine for narrow 750 mm gauge, 76 units produced, 66 units delivered to the Soviet Union. Valmet sold the remaining 10 units to Saalasti Engineering, who sold them to the private narrow gauge railways in Finland. Five of them were converted to 5-feet-gauge (1524 mm)  museum exhibit, Jokioinen Museum Railway

Vessels
Finland delivered to the Soviet union 619 vessels of which 119 were used. 104 vessels were commercial ones.

Icebreakers
SS Turso,  a harbour icebreaker originally built for Finnish use, 8 February 1945 to the Soviet Union in Leningrad, bought back to Finland 2004 by Satamajäänsärkijä S/S Turso registered society, 2006 in Hietalahti harbour, Helsinki
The delivery was followed by a class of similar icebreakers.
State-owned steam-powered icebreakers Jääkarhu and Voima

Schooners
All the schooners were mainly 300-dead-weight-tonne schooners, of which 91 were delivered to the Soviet Union.

Ship industry
 300-dead-weight-tonne ocean three-masted schooners with a 225 hp June Munktell diesel engines or Valmet Linnavuori licence production, 45 units, built by Laivateollisuus in Turku
 non-magnetic research schooner Zarya
 One of the schooners, Vega, is a museum in Jakobstad. Vega was written off in 1979 and it was moved to a dry dock in 1986. Eesti Meremuseum had a project for its restoration, but the work did not start. The schooner was not well protected and its condition started to worsen. The Finns planned to save the Vega, but the plans did not succeed. Pietarsaaren Vanha Satama Oy decided to establish a Vega foundation, which was registered on 3 June 1996.

F. W. Hollming docks
300-dead-weight-tonne ocean three-masted schooners with 225 hp engines, 34 units, in Rauma,  First keel laying, 15 June 1946.

August Eklöf docks
300-dead-weight-tonne ocean three-masted schooners with 225 hp engines, seven units, in Porvoo.

Wooden houses

Puutalo

For delivering the needed amount of the wooden houses to the Soviet Union, a joint venture, Puutalo Oy, was established. The last delivery of wooden houses took place on 28 January 1948. The deliveries started on 22 December 1944. Altogether the floor area of the delivered wooden houses was 840,000 m2.  The war reparation itself contributed 177,000 m2 as compensation for the German property, which Finland did not hand over to the Soviet Union. This consisted of 37,208 railway wagons, which as a single train would have been 335 km long.

522 wooden houses, Oulu company Pateniemi saw mill

See also 
 Finnish maritime cluster

References

External links 
 

Finland
Economic history of the Soviet Union
Finland–Soviet Union relations
Continuation War
Reparations
1944 establishments in Finland
1952 disestablishments in Finland